The Breda Ba.25 was an Italian two-seat biplane trainer designed and built by the Breda company. It was the most widely used Italian basic trainer of the 1930s.

Design and development
The first flight took place near Milan in 1931. Initially designed as a single-seat aircraft, the prototype was later converted to a two-seat fuselage. Flight testing of the two-seat variant was successful, and in late 1931 Regia Aeronautica ordered a series of 100 Ba.25 training aircraft. The student and instructor sat in open tandem cockpits, although some versions had a single-bay cockpit.

The initial production order was completed by 1935, but demand for the aircraft increased and production for the Regia Aeronautica totalled 719 by the end of 1938. Many others were produced for export or for private use with different radial engines like the Alfa Romeo Lynx or Walter Castor.

Operational history
The Ba.25 remained in service of the Regia Aeronautica as a training aircraft during World War II. Some of the aircraft were seized and handed over to the Allies. Paraguay bought four Breda Ba.25, one of them a Ba.25Idro. They were used as primary trainers from 1939 to 1945.

Variants

There were many minor variants:
Ba.25
Main production version.
Ba.25/Lynx
Fitted with a 149 kW (200 hp) Alfa Romeo Lynx engine.
Ba.25/D.2
Fitted with a 179 kW (240 hp) Alfa Romeo D2 engine.
Ba.25/Mezzo-Asso
Fitted with a 164 kW (220 hp) Isotta-Fraschini Asso 200 engine.
Ba.25 Ridotto'''
Reduced-span aerobatic version.
Ba.25-I (I for Idro)
Floatplane version (42 built, one for Paraguayan Naval Aviation)
Ba.26
Primary trainer with a longer wingspan and Walter NZ 120 engine, prototype only.
Ba.28
Export version with Piaggio-built Gnome-Rhône 7K engine for Norway, China and Ethiopia, among others.
The Ba.28 training aircraft was developed from the earlier Ba.25. In June 1936 the prototype was shown at the air show in Venice. The Italian Air Force in the same year ordered a series of 50 aircraft. During use in flight schools the Ba.28 proved not to be among the best – it was difficult to manage in the air. However, orders for the type arrived from abroad – were duly delivered to the following countries: Afghanistan (2), China (18), Norway (6), Austria (12) and Spain (6).

Operators

Afghan Air Force

Austrian Air Force (1927-1938)

Bolivian Air Force operated 6 aircraft (1939)

Republic of China Air Force

Ecuadorian Air Force

Ethiopian Air Force

Royal Hungarian Air Force operated 3 aircraftRegia AeronauticaAviazione Legionaria
Italian Co-Belligerent Air ForceAeronautica Nazionale Repubblicana''

Royal Norwegian Navy Air Service

Paraguayan Military Aviation used three Ba.25.
Paraguayan Naval Aviation used one Ba.25 Idro.

Spanish Air Force

Specifications (Ba.25)

See also

Notes

References

External links

Ba.25 entry at the Уголок неба website (Russian)

Ba.025
1930s Italian military trainer aircraft
Single-engined tractor aircraft
Biplanes
Aircraft first flown in 1931